Modena Weston (also referred to by her maiden name, Modena McColl; August 3, 1816 in Albany, New York – November 25, 1898 in Bay St. Louis, Mississippi) was a nurse for the Union during the American Civil War.

Nursing career 
She enlisted in military service as a nurse in Iowa on September 1, 1861. Her service began with the 3rd Iowa Infantry Hospital. She quickly became a mother to the regiment, working to quell the numerous outbreaks of measles and smallpox. Weston moved to the Benton Barracks, where she was the only woman serving but the station had an adequate supply of sanitary goods. Conditions would not be as good as she moved with the regiment to Mexico, Missouri. Here she established a field hospital where the staff would remain as the regiment moved about. At this location, the water supply was poor and often contributed to further illness.

In a letter to Mary Holland, the most noteworthy moment of Weston's service was during the Battle of Shiloh. Here, in addition to the regiment, Weston cared for the wounded crew of a steamship after the battle. From this location, Weston once again moved to River Landing. Here she cared for hundreds of wounded individuals. Once again, at this location, Weston was the only woman serving. Much like her prior experience, supplies were short and Weston had to request food, and only received supplies after a few days of duty. Weston describes in her letter four women joining her in service, but she was soon once again the only woman as the others were wounded and left. Weston remained at this location until September when the hospital was broken up; after, she served at Jackson until March 1863 only to travel again to Memphis then to Washington, D.C. On April 20, 1863, Weston received a commission from Dorothea Dix, and in January 1864 reported to J.D. Erwin to be sent to serve as a matron at a smallpox hospital. Weston finished her military service at this location in October 1866. She was never paid for her service.

References 

1816 births
1898 deaths
American Civil War nurses
American women nurses
People from Albany, New York
Women in the American Civil War